Kessleria wehrlii is a moth of the family Yponomeutidae. It is found in France.

The length of the forewings is 8.1-9.5 mm for males and 6.2 mm for females. The forewings are white with greyish scales. The hindwings are light grey. Adults have been recorded in July.

The larvae possibly feed on Saxifraga retusa.

References

Moths described in 1992
Yponomeutidae
Moths of Europe